Deane Brown is a former Grand Prix motorcycle racer from Great Britain. He has previously competed in the Red Bull MotoGP Rookies Cup, the British 125cc Championship, the British National Superstock 600 Championship and the British National Superstock 1000 Championship.

Career statistics

Grand Prix motorcycle racing

By season

Races by year

Other series

British 125cc Championship

National Superstock 600

British Supersport Championship

* Denotes season still in progress

References

External links
 Profile on motogp.com

Scottish motorcycle racers
Living people
125cc World Championship riders
1993 births